Lovell is an English surname. Notable people with the surname include:
Adam Lovell (born 1977), founder of WriteAPrisoner.com
Alan Lovell (born 1953), British businessman
Alex Lovell (born 1973), British television presenter
Andy Lovell (born 1970), Australian football player
Ann Lovell (c. 1811 – 1869), wife of James Lovell; first European settlers in Golden Bay, New Zealand
Avon Lovell (born 1945), Australian investigative journalist
Bernard Lovell (1913–2012), British radio astronomer
Charles Lovell (disambiguation), several people, including
Charles C. Lovell (born 1929), United States federal judge
Charles Henry Lovell (1854–1916), farmer, lumber merchant and political figure in Quebec
Charles Lovell (trade unionist) (1923–2014), British trade union leader
Christopher Lovell (born 1967), English cricketer
Curtis Lovell II, American illusionist and escape artist
Cyrus Lovell (1804–1895), American politician
Daniel Lovell (died 1818), English journalist
David Lovell (born 1969), Australian born Welsh cricketer
David Lovell (Bermudian cricketer) (born 1983)
Dyson Lovell (born 1936), film producer and actor
Ellen McCulloch-Lovell, college president
Francis Lovell, 1st Viscount Lovell (1456 – not earlier than 1487), supporter of Richard III in the Wars of the Roses
Frank Lovell (1913–1998), American communist politician
Frederick S. Lovell (1813–1878), American politician and military officer
Fulke Lovell (died 1285), Bishop of London-elect (1280), Archdeacon of Colchester (1263–1267).
Fulton Lovell (1913–1980), American politician and commissioner in Georgia
George William Lovell (1804–1878), English dramatist
Glenville Lovell (born 1955), Barbadian writer
Guillermo Lovell (1918–1967), Argentine boxer
Harold Lovell (born 1955), government minister in Antigua and Barbuda
Henry Lovell (1828–1907), Canadian politician
Henry Tasman Lovell (1878–1958), Australian psychologist
Jacqueline Lovell (born 1974), American actress
James Lovell (disambiguation), several people, including
 James Lovell (Continental Congress) (1736–1814), a Continental Congress delegate from Massachusetts
 James Lovell (sculptor) (died 1778), an English sculptor
Jean Lovell (1926–1992), American female baseball player
Jenifer Lovell (born 1974), American rhythmic gymnast
Jenny Lovell, Australian actress
Jessamyn Lovell (born 1977), American visual artist
Jim Lovell (born 1928), a U.S. astronaut of Apollo 8 and commander of Apollo 13
Jim Lovell (British Army soldier) (1899–2004), the last surviving decorated 'Tommy' of the First World War
Jocelyn Lovell (1950–2016), Canadian cyclist
John Lovell (disambiguation), several people, including
John Lovell (grocer) (c. 1851 – 1913), businessman in Los Angeles, California
John C. Lovell (born 1967), American sailor
John Harvey Lovell (1860–1939), entomologist in Maine
Joseph Lovell (1788–1836), Surgeon General of the United States Army
Julia Lovell (born 1975), British sinologist
Karl Lovell (born 1977), Australian rugby player
Kevin Lovell (born 1984), American football placekicker
Kieran Lovell (born 1997), Australian rules footballer
Lawrence Lovell (born 1944), British hockey player
Liliana Lovell (born 1967), American entrepreneur, founder of the Coyote Ugly Saloon
Mansfield Lovell (1822–1884), major general in the Confederate States Army
Marc Lovell (born 1982), English hockey player
Margaretta M. Lovell, American professor of art history
Maria Ann Lovell, née Lacy (1803–1877), English actress and playwright
Mary S. Lovell, British writer
Mark Lovell (1960–2003), British rally driver
Mark Lovell (footballer) (born 1983), English footballer 
Matt Lovell, Australian record producer
Michael Lovell (born c. 1967), American engineer, and President of Marquette University
Michael C. Lovell (born 1930), American economist
Moodie Brock Lovell (1853–1902), Canadian politician
Nigel Lovell (1916–2001), Australian stage and radio actor and producer
Night Lovell (Shermar Paul; born 1997), Canadian rapper and record producer
Noel Lovell (born 1961), Australian rules footballer
Patricia Lovell (1929–2013), Australian film producer
Patsy Lovell (born 1954), English cricketer
Pedro Lovell (born 1945), Argentine boxer
Rachel Lovell (born 1978), Australian kayak racer
Rata Lovell-Smith (née Bird; 1894–1969), New Zealand artist
Raymond Lovell (1900–1953), Canadian-British film actor
Robert Lovell (died 1796), English poet
Salathiel Lovell (died 1713), British judge
Santiago Lovell (1912–1966), Argentine boxer
Sarah Lovell (born 1980), Australian politician
Sidney Lovell (died 1938), American architect
Simon Lovell (born 1957), British comedy magician and card magician
Simone Lovell (born 1934), British actress
Solomon Lovell (1732–1801), militia brigadier general during the American Revolutionary War
Steve Lovell (born 1980), English soccer player
Steve Lovell (Welsh footballer) (born 1960)
Stuart Lovell (born 1972), Australian professional footballer
Sue Lovell (born 1950), American politician
Tiffany Roberts-Lovell, American politician
Thomas Lovell (died 1524), English soldier and administrator
Thomas Lovell (died 1567), English politician
Tom Lovell (1909–1997), American illustrator and painter
Tony Lovell (1919–1945), British military pilot
Tyler Lovell (born 1987), Australian field hockey player
Vella Lovell (born 1985), American actress
Walter Lovell (1884–1937), American military pilot
Wendy Lovell (born 1959), Australian politician
Whitfield Lovell (born 1959), American artist
Will Lovell (born 1993), English rugby player
The Lovell family, Lairds of Ballumbie
Robin Lovell-Badge, British geneticist
Peter Lovell-Davis, Baron Lovell-Davis (1924–2001), British publishing executive and politician
William Lovell-Hewitt (1901–1984), English cricketer
Kitty Lovell-Smith (Hilda Kate Lovell-Smith; 1886–1973), New Zealand businesswoman and community organiser

Surnames
English-language surnames
Surnames of English origin
Surnames of British Isles origin